Richard Jones (1936 – 1986) was one of the co-founders of the United Tasmania Group (UTG), the world's first Green party and the predecessor of the Tasmanian Greens. He was the UTG's first president when it formed in March 1972, through to the middle 1970s. At the time Jones was an academic biologist working at the University of Tasmania. He helped form the Centre for Environmental Studies Unit at the University of Tasmania and was active in transforming the Australian Conservation Foundation from an apolitical to a political force.

References

Further reading
 Peter Hay, Robyn Eckersley and Geoff Holloway (eds) (1989) . Environmental politics in Australia and New Zealand. Hobart : Board of Environmental Studies, University of Tasmania. 
 Occasional paper (University of Tasmania. Centre for Environmental Studies) ; 23. "These essays are respectfully dedicated to the memory of Dr Richard Jones".
 Armstrong, Lance J.E. (1997). Good God, He’s Green! A History of Tasmanian Politics 1989-1996. Wahroonga, N.S.W., Pacific Law Press. 
 Lines, William J. (2006) Patriots : defending Australia's natural heritage  St. Lucia, Qld. : University of Queensland Press, 2006.  

1936 births
1986 deaths
Australian environmentalists
20th-century Australian politicians
United Tasmania Group